Ancilla giaquintoi is a species of sea snail, a marine gastropod mollusk in the family Ancillariidae, the olives and the like.

Description
The length of the shell can vary between 15 mm and 22 mm.

Distribution
This species occurs in the Indian Ocean off Somalia and Madagascar.

References

External links
 

giaquintoi
Gastropods described in 2006